Singapore has about 65 species of mammals, 390 species of birds, 110 species of reptiles, 30 species of amphibians, more than 300 butterfly species, 127 dragonfly species, and over 2,000 recorded species of marine wildlife.

The Central Catchment Nature Reserve and the nearby Bukit Timah Nature Reserve are the stronghold of the remaining forest animals on the mainland. These enclose the only remnants of primary forest on the island. The former includes four reservoirs (MacRitchie, Upper Peirce, Lower Peirce, Upper Seletar). The northeastern offshore islands of Pulau Ubin and Pulau Tekong are also rich in wildlife.

Other areas of note are Sungei Buloh Wetland Reserve, Singapore Botanic Gardens, Bukit Batok Nature Park, Pulau Semakau, etc.

Fauna

Mammals
Birds
Reptiles
Amphibians
Fish
Invertebrates

Nature areas
Admiralty Park
Bidadari Cemetery
Bukit Batok Nature Park
Bukit Brown Cemetery
Bukit Timah Nature Reserve
Central Catchment Nature Reserve
Changi Reclaimed Land
Choa Chu Kang Cemetery
Dairy Farm Nature Park
Coney Island
Jurong Lake
Kusu Island
Labrador Nature Reserve
Lorong Halus
Neo Tiew Lane
Pasir Ris Park
Pulau Hantu
Pulau Semakau
Pulau Tekong
Pulau Ubin
Sentosa
Singapore Botanic Gardens
Sisters' Islands
Southern Ridges
St. John Island
Sungei Buloh Wetland Reserve
Sungei Punggol
Sungei Serangoon
Tampines Eco Green
Tuas
West Coast Park
Western Water Catchment

See also
Flora of Singapore
National Parks Board
Wildlife of Singapore

Citations